The United States Court for China was a United States district court that had extraterritorial jurisdiction over U.S. citizens in China. It existed from 1906 to 1943 and had jurisdiction in civil and criminal matters, with appeals taken to the U.S. Court of Appeals for the Ninth Circuit in San Francisco.

Consular courts prior to establishment of court

Extraterritorial jurisdiction in China was first granted to the United States by the Treaty of Wanghia upon ratification in 1845, followed by the Treaty of Tientsin ratified in 1860.

Under the treaties, cases against US citizens were tried in US consular courts, while cases against Chinese nationals were tried in Chinese courts. Consuls had jurisdiction in the following matters:

 criminal cases where the punishment for the offense charged did not exceed a $100 fine or 60 days imprisonment, from which there was no appeal;
 criminal cases where the punishment for the offense charged did not exceed a $500 fine or 90 days imprisonment, from which an appeal was available to the commissioner of the United States in China; and
 civil cases, in which those for damages not exceeding $500 were generally not subject to appeal.

The commissioner had jurisdiction to hear all cases, and could prescribe rules of civil and criminal procedure for the consuls to follow.

Establishment of court

The court was established in 1906 by the Act Creating a United States Court for China.  The court was similar in structure to the British Supreme Court for China and Corea that had been established in Shanghai in 1865.

The court was originally headquartered in the American Consulate General building on Huangpu Road in the Shanghai International Settlement, with additional sessions held at least annually in the Chinese cities of Canton, Tientsin, and Hankow. The court moved with the US Consulate when the consulate was moved from its previous premises in the years 1911, 1930 and 1936.

The court had only one full-time judge, and those on trial sometimes had to wait months for proceedings. In the 1930s, the law was amended to allow the appointment of special judges, allowing trials to proceed in the judge's absence.  Appeals were allowed to the United States Court of Appeals for the Ninth Circuit.

The U.S. consular courts in China retained limited jurisdiction, including civil cases where property involved in the controversy did not exceed $500 and criminal cases where the punishment did not exceed $100 in fines or 60 days' imprisonment. The Court exercised appellate jurisdiction over them, as well as, until 1910 when Japan annexed Korea, US Consular Courts in Korea.

Jurisprudence
The court's jurisdiction was given an expansive interpretation:

 while the treaty strictly covered only US citizens, the court assumed jurisdiction over US non-citizen nationals who originated from "possessions" (i.e. colonies) such as the Philippines and Guam.
 even where the State Department discriminated against Chinese-Americans living abroad in China, the court held that "an American citizen in China, whether residing temporarily or permanently, remains as much under the jurisdiction of his government, its laws and its institutions as if he were residing at home."
 it enforced consular title deeds where US citizens held land in trust for Chinese beneficiaries.
 in divorce and annulment cases, only the plaintiff had to be an American resident in China: there were no residency or nationality requirements for defendants.

The sources of law drawn upon by the court were quite varied:

 Because the court was based outside of the United States, the United States Constitution did not apply; there was no right to a jury trial nor to constitutional due process.
 It was also provided that where "the laws of the United States ... are deficient in the provisions necessary to give jurisdiction or to furnish suitable remedies, the common law and the law as established by the decisions of the courts of the United States shall be applied."
 The municipal regulations of the Shanghai International Settlement were also recognized and given effect.
 Traditional Chinese law was applied by the court in some cases, as well as local "compradore" or "Chinese custom."

The question as to what constituted "common law" led to severe difficulties, because U.S. federal law did not cover many criminal offenses or civil matters (which were normally provided for by U.S. state law). The Ninth Circuit provided a solution to this conundrum in the case of Biddle v. United States, where it was held that the laws of the Territory of Alaska or the District of Columbia were federal law and could be applied by the court. As a result, Judge Lobingier would later hold that "there can be no half way adoption of that doctrine; it includes all such laws or none. It cannot logically be restricted to any particular class of acts. It is just as applicable to civil laws as to criminal; just as 'necessary' in respect to corporations as to procedure."

The court prescribed its own rules for procedures to be followed. This was in contrast to the situation in the States, where civil procedure in actions at law (i.e., most lawsuits for monetary damages) in U.S. federal courts was normally provided for by state law, by virtue of the Conformity Act of 1872, until the promulgation of the Federal Rules of Civil Procedure in 1938.

The United States Congress also passed several statutes conferring specific powers on the court:

  An Act to Regulate the Practice of Pharmacy and the Sale of Poison in the Consular Districts of the United States in China, 
 China Trade Act, 1922, as amended by

Court seal

The act establishing the court provided:  "The seal of the United States Court for China shall be the arms of the United States, engraved on a circular piece of steel of the size of a half dollar, with these words in the margin 'The Seal of the United States Court for China'".  The seal was to be used to seal all writs, processes and other documents issued by the court.

Imprisonment

People who received relatively short sentences for criminal offences were either imprisoned in the Consular Gaol in the consulate or in either Ward Road Gaol or Amoy Road Gaol, both run by the Shanghai Municipal Council.  Those serving longer sentences were sent to Bilibid Prison in the Philippines and later from the 1920s were generally sent to the federal penitentiary at McNeil Island in Washington State to serve their sentence.

Abolition

The United States Consulate and Court in Shanghai were occupied by the Japanese on December 8, 1941, at the beginning of the Pacific War.  The Judge and other staff were interned for 6 months before being repatriated.

Americans continued to enjoy extraterritorial rights in those parts of China not occupied by the Japanese. On January 11, 1943, the U.S. and China signed the Treaty for Relinquishment of Extraterritorial Rights in China, thereby relinquishing all U.S. extraterritorial rights.   The treaty was ratified by the United States Senate and came into force on May 20, 1943. As a result, both the U.S. Court for China and the U.S. Consular Courts in China were abolished. However, their judgments continued to serve as res judicata within China.

The last case before the court was heard in Kunming starting on 14 January 1943. Boatner Carney of the Flying Tigers was prosecuted for manslaughter before Special Judge Bertrand E. Johnson.  Carney was convicted of unlawful killing and sentenced to two years imprisonment. He was pardoned 6 months later by President Franklin D. Roosevelt.

Judges

Substantive appointments

Special Judges

Two individuals were also appointed Special Judges of the Court to try cases when the Judge was not available.  They were:

 Nelson Lurton (1938 and 1941)
 Bertrand E Johnson (1943)

Commissioners
 1918–1920: Nelson Erroll Lurton (1883–1956)
 1920–1923: Ferno J. Schul (1889-??)
 1923–1928: Nelson Erroll Lurton (1883-1956)
 1928–1933: Alexander Krisel (1890–1983)
 1934-1937: William T. Collins (ex-officio as Clerk of the Court)
 1937–1941: Nelson Errol Lurton (1883-1956)

Notable Attorneys
The following attorneys of note were admitted to practice before the court:

See also 

 Shanghai International Settlement
 British Supreme Court for China

Notes

References

Further reading 
  (Republished with annotations and Illustrations as: Shanghai Lawyer: The Memoirs of America's China Spy Master, Earnshaw Books, 2017)
 , Vol. 1: ; Vol. 2: ; Vol. 3: .

External links

Legislation
Act Creating the United States Court for China

Investigations
Charges against Lebbeus R. Wilfley, Judge of the United States Court for China, and Petition for His Removal from Office
United States Court for China: Hearings before the Committee on Foreign Affairs (HR)

US National Archive files
Correspondence relating to and case files of the US Court for China (M862 Roll 80)
US Court for China case reports from 1907 (M862 Roll 81)
Correspondence relating to the US Court for China (M862 Roll 82)
Consular files relating to charges against Judge Wilfley and other correspondence (M862 Roll 83)
Consular files relating to charges against Judge Wilfley with numerous newspaper clippings and transcript of R v O’Shea and appointment of Rufus Thayer (M862 Roll 84)
Consular Files relating to US Court for China (up to p283) (M862 Roll 85)
General consular correspondence including cases before consular courts in China and prison escape in 1906 (pp. 213 et seq) (M862 Roll 92)
Correspondence relating to charges against Wilfley by Lorrin Andrews (up to page 232) (Record Group 59: General Records of the Department of State, 1763–2002 Series: Numerical Files, 8/1906 - 1910 File Unit: Numerical File: 4769–4787)

1906 establishments in China
1943 disestablishments in China
China
Court for China
Legal history of China
Defunct United States courts
Defunct courts
Foreign relations of the Qing dynasty
History of Shanghai
Shanghai International Settlement
Extraterritorial jurisdiction
Courts and tribunals established in 1906
Courts and tribunals disestablished in 1943
American expatriates in Shanghai